Steve Wariner is the eponymous debut album by the American country music artist of the same name. It was released in 1982 by RCA Nashville. The album produced six singles overall on the Billboard Hot Country Singles chart including "All Roads Lead to You" which stayed at number one for one week and spent a total of twelve weeks on the chart.

Track listing

Personnel

 Lea Jane Berinati – background vocals
 Steve Brantley – background vocals
 David Briggs – piano
 Jimmy Capps – acoustic guitar
 Jerry Carrigan – drums
 Cherry Sisters – background vocals 
 Johnny Christopher – electric guitar
 Bruce Dees – electric guitar, background vocals
 Bobby Emmons – keyboards
 Sonny Garrish – steel guitar
 Jim Glaser – background vocals
 Randy Goodrum – piano
 George Grantham – background vocals
 Hoot Hester – fiddle
 John Hughey – steel guitar 
 Shane Keister – piano, synthesizer
 Larry Keith – background vocals 
 Mike Leech – bass guitar
 Dennis Morgan – acoustic guitar
 Cam Mullins – string arrangements 
 Fred Newell – electric guitar, mandolin
 Louis Dean Nunley – background vocals 
 Bobby Ogdin – organ, piano
 Joe Osborn – bass guitar
 Charles Quillen – background vocals
 Gordon Stoker – background vocals 
 James Stroud – drums
 Karen Taylor – background vocals 
 Steve Wariner – acoustic guitar, electric guitar, lead vocals, background vocals
 D. Bergen White – string arrangements 
 Marcia Wood – background vocals
 Paul Yandell – electric guitar
 Reggie Young – electric guitar

Chart performance

Album

References

Steve Wariner albums
1982 debut albums
RCA Records albums
Albums produced by Tom Collins (record producer)